"Treasured Soul" is a song recorded by French DJ and producer Michael Calfan. The song was released on 12 January 2015 for digital download. The single peaked at number 17 in the UK, number 66 in Switzerland and number 101 in France.

Track listing
Digital download
"Treasured Soul" – 4:24

Treasured Soul (Chocolate Puma Remix)
"Treasured Soul"  – 5:30
Treasured Soul (The Remixes)
"Treasured Soul"  – 5:05
"Treasured Soul"  – 5:54
"Treasured Soul"  – 3:28

Charts

Certifications

References

2015 singles
2015 songs
Deep house songs
Spinnin' Records singles